Anarmodia punctilinealis is a moth in the family Crambidae. It was described by George Hampson in 1899. It is found in Ecuador.

The wingspan is about 50 mm. The forewings are fulvous yellow with a fuscous antemedial line and a curved series of postmedial black points on the veins. The basal area and inner area on the hindwings are paler.

References

Moths described in 1899
Spilomelinae
Moths of South America